Robert Mumbi  is a Zambian  bishop in the Church of the Province of Central Africa: he is Bishop of Luapula, ne of five dioceses in Zambia

References

Anglican bishops of Luapula
21st-century Anglican bishops in Africa
Living people
Year of birth missing (living people)